Mazurzenie or mazuration is the replacement or merger of Polish's series of postalveolar fricatives and affricates  (written ) into the dentialveolar series  (written ). This merger is present in many dialects, but is named for the Masovian dialect.

This phonological feature is observed in dialects of Masuria and Masovia (Masovian dialect), as well as in most of Lesser Poland and parts of Silesia. There are also some peripheral mazurating islands in Greater Poland. The boundary of  runs from north-east to south-west. It may have originated between the 14th and 16th centuries in the Masovian dialect.

A rarer term for mazuration is sakanie.

In this article terms such as "non-mazurating", "without mazuration" are taken to refer to dialects which have a three way distinction among sibilants, as does Standard Polish. Technically dialects with e.g. jabłonkowanie also do not mazurate, but for the sake of simplicity this will not be discussed in the article.

Distribution 

Mazuration is a widespread phenomenon. It is present in Masovia including Masuria (former Ducal Prussia), all of Lesser Poland except the southeast areas bordering on Ukraine, eastern and northern Upper Silesia including Opole and Katowice, as well as the central Polish lands around Sieradz, Łęczyca and Łowicz. A peculiarity are three mazurating islands on the periphery of Greater Poland: several towns around Wieleń, several more near Rawicz and Chwalim – a single village near Wolsztyn.

Non-mazurating territories in the west include Greater Poland, Kuyavia and the Lands of Chełmno and Dobrzyń, southwestern Upper Silesia, Pomeralia and former Royal Prussia (Warmia, areas around Ostróda and Lubawa). Eastern Polish dialects which border on Ukraine, Belarus and Lithuania also do not mazurate. These include the eastern reaches of Lesser Poland around the rivers San and Wisłok (around Rzeszów and Przemyśl; historically part of Red Ruthenia), areas east of Wieprz (Lublin Land), Podlachia and some areas in the Suwałki Region (Sejny, Puńsk).

Description 
Standard (or literary) Polish has three symmetrical series of sibilants – fricatives and affricates articulated by directing the airstream through the teeth. These are the dentialveolar, alveolo-palatal, and postalveolar (usually called retroflex by Western scholars, but they are not subapical). These are presented in the table below.

These two sounds are nowadays usually analyzed as separate phonemes, but until recently they were considered allophones and they are still largely in complementary distribution, contrasting mostly in positions after labials (unless palatalized labials are considered separate phonemes) and recent loanwords (see also: Polish phonology – a relevant section). For earlier (pre-modern) stages of Polish  and  must be considered allophones of a single phoneme .

To fully understand not only the phenomenon itself, but to be able to discuss its origins and chronology it is necessary to look at the phonological history of these sounds in Polish. Below is the system as it looked like from around the 13th century until the 16th century (see also: Old Polish – section on phonology).

Another important fact was that from around the 13th century there existed the // phoneme, which descended from earlier softened .

The hardening (depalatalization) of the postalveolar series and the affricates  and  happened around the 16th century. In non-mazurating dialects the resultant system was as described at the beginning of this section. In mazurating dialects the system was instead simplified, and the postalveolar sibilants merged completely with the dentialveolars:

leaving only two series of sibilants. The two earlier soft affricates depalatalized as in the other dialects. Significantly, the new dentialveolars, continuing earlier postalveolars, are now also hard, as in the non-masurating dialects, so  always follows them, not  (but see below).

Also important is the fate of : in most dialects, both mazurating and not, this sound shifted to  around the 18th century. In dialects without mazuration this caused its merger with former original . Since Polish spelling follows etymology, this sound is spelled ⟨rz⟩, while the original  is spelled ⟨ż⟩. But in mazurating dialects there was already no  to begin with, so that phoneme only changed its articulation.

Below are some examples, which showcase the differences between mazurating and non-mazurating pronunciation:

Causes 
Several hypotheses have been put forth to explain the origin of mazuration. Very heated discussions on this subject took place in Polish academic circles from 1947 into the 1950s. Naturally the question of dating, which was discussed even more, is very closely connected.

Foreign influence 
 was the first to suggest Old Prussian substrate influence as the origin of mazuration. This hypothesis was later expanded by Selishchev and Milewski. It has been shown that in Polish loanwords in Old Prussian the Polish postalveolar fricatives  are regularly substituted by the dentialveolar fricatives , eg.  from Polish ,  from Polish  (Old Prussian  is spelled ). According to this theory mazuration was a feature of speech of Polonized Prussians in Mazuria (see Masurian dialect), and spread from there. This is consistent with the accounts that the phenomenon began somewhere in Masovia and spread from there.

Other proposals seeking to explain the origin of mazuration in terms of language contact include the idea of German influence developed by Trautmann using similar arguments as described above for Old Prussian, as well as prehistoric Celtic or even Uralic influences. Milewski rejects the latter two outright, as he deems them impossible to either prove or disprove based on historical records.

Internal development 
In the former case these phonemes merely changed their manner of articulation to unpalatalized, while in the latter case the loss of such a distinct feature caused them to coalesce together with the dentialveolars. The different treatment in different dialects could then perhaps be explained by an older difference in the pronunciation of that series.

It has also been proposed that this and similar mergers (see below) were caused by the overloading of the Old Polish phonological system by sibilants. Milewski adds to this also similar examples in the history of Mongolic languages. Together with Koneczna and Kuryłowicz he opines, however, that this cannot be the main cause of this phenomenon, as it did not affect the entirety of the Polish speaking area, in spite of the conditions being the same everywhere. It must therefore be posited that it was only one of the causes of mazuration, a prerequisite but not a deciding factor.

A unique theory proposed by Kuryłowicz also states that the origin of mazuration is connected to the aforementioned depalatalization, but in a different way. Namely, taking into account the fact that the change  >  did not happen everywhere at the same time, he posits that in areas where dialects which had already undergone the change (innovative dialects) neighbored dialects which still had the older pronunciation (archaic dialects), the archaic dialects wanted to introduce this sound change themselves (as the change was an innovation it had a tendency to spread).

Mazuration and the literary language 	
Since the Polish literary language does not have mazuration, it has long been (usually) considered an inferior pronunciation. Those who wanted to rid their speech of this feature did not know which words should be pronounced using the postalveolar sounds – which were foreign to them – unless they heard it from a speaker with distinction, but in other cases they made frequent mistakes.

Occasionally a mazurating pronunciation of words made its way to the literary standard and became normative.

Similar mergers 
In other Polish dialects a different merger called  happens. It is found in the dialects near Jabłonków in Silesia and in the north in Warmia and around Ostróda and Lubawa and causes the merger of Standard Polish alveolopalatal consonants and retroflex consonants into an intermediate series.  is commonly discussed together with mazuration as possibly stemming from the same causes (see above in the "Causes" section).

 is a merger of alveolopalatal and dental sibilants in the Kashubian language.

A phonomenon similar to mazuration also occurs in a few areas of the Chakavian dialect of Croatian, where it is known as tsakavism.

In the Belarusian language mazuration was borrowed by the dialects of a few villages in Podlachia directly from neighboring Polish dialects.

The now extinct Polabian language exhibited a parallel change in some of its dialects. Of the surviving material Pfeffinger's  rather consistently distinguishes the reflexes of Proto-Slavic *s, *z, *c and *š, *ž, *č, while the other works seem to represent a dialect (or dialects) which merged those sounds.

A more narrow merger affecting only voiceless affricates occurs in some other Slavic areas. In East Slavic it is present in Northern Russian dialects. This feature is termed  if the merger is towards a dental affricate and  if it is towards a postalveolar affricate. Among the West Slavic languages, Lower Sorbian changed the earlier  into , while in Upper Sorbian they remain distinct.

See also 
 Jabłonkowanie
 Szadzenie
 Ts–ch merger
 Sabesdiker losn
 Depalatalization

Notes

References

Bibliography 

Sound changes
Slavic phonologies
Polish dialects